Parabuchanosteus murrumbidgeensis is an extinct buchanosteid arthrodire placoderm.  Its fossils have been found in the Late Emsian-aged marine strata of New South Wales, Australia.

It was originally described as Buchanosteus murrumbidgeensis in 1952.  Twenty years later, it was reexamined and promoted to a new genus.

References

Buchanosteidae
Placoderms of Australia